The 1983 Cologne Cup, also known as the European Indoor Championships, was a men's tennis tournament played on indoor carpet courts in Cologne, West Germany that was part of the 1983 Volvo Grand Prix circuit. It was the eighth edition of the tournament and was held from 24 October through 30 October 1983. Unseeded Matt Doyle won the singles title.

Finals

Singles
 Matt Doyle defeated  Hans-Dieter Beutel 1–6, 6–1, 6–2
 It was Doyle's only singles title of his career.

Doubles
 Nick Saviano /  Florin Segărceanu defeated  Paul Annacone /  Eric Korita 6–3, 6–4

References

External links
 ITF tournament edition details

Cologne Cup
Cologne Cup